Sai Vidya Institute of Technology (SVIT) is an engineering college in Rajanukunte, Yelahanka, Bangalore, India. It was ranked 35th in the Top 100 T-Schools (private) and 53rd in Top 100 T-Schools (overall) in the All India T Schools Survey conducted by Data Quest Magazine. Among colleges in Karnataka it was 7th and 9th respectively in the ranking lists. Established in 2008, SVIT offers six undergraduate courses and one post-graduate course and is affiliated to the Visvesvaraya Technological University. The institution is accredited by AICTE, NBA (New Delhi) and recognized by the government of Karnataka.

History
SVIT was founded in 2008 by Sri Sai Vidya Vikas Shikshana Samithi, a trust consisting of highly experienced professors who were previously with reputed institutions such as RVCE, UVCE, BIT and RNSIT.

Prof. M R Holla, a recipient of the Karnataka Rajyotsava award and former principal of RVCE and director of RNSIT, is the director of the college. Dr. Ramesh Babu H S is the principal.

The Board of Trustees also consists of well-renowned professors like Dr. Y Jayasimha, Prof. R C Shanmukha Swamy and Dr. A M Padma Reddy. It includes R Srinivas Raju, a practicing civil engineer; M K Manohar, a renowned chartered accountant; and Narayana Raju, an administrator at RVCE and RNSIT.

Campus
SVIT is spread over 12 acres Rajanukunte, Bangalore. The nearest commuter railway station is Rajanukunte.

The institution has two separate hostels for boys and girls to cater to the needs of the students from other parts of the country. Each hostel has its own kitchen and dining areas and is supported by a team of experienced cooks.

Courses offered

Undergraduate courses
SVIT offers Bachelor of Engineering (BE) at the undergraduate level. The course spans over four years and is offered in six branches. The course structure is based on the guidelines framed by VTU.

Undergraduate BE courses offered:

Computer Science and Engineering
Computer Science Engineering (Artificial Intelligence and Machine Learning)
Computer Science Engineering (Data Science)
Information Science and Engineering
Mechanical Engineering
Civil Engineering

Post-graduate course
SVIT offers post-graduate course:

Master of Business Administration (MBA)

Placements

In 2016, SVIT placed 98% of all eligible students. The college has industry collaborations and placed its students in companies including several top recruiters such as HCL, Tech Mahindra, HP, IBM, iGATE, CGI Group, OnMobile, Siemens, Syntel, Wipro, Indian Air Force, TCS, Cognizant, Mphasis, NTT DATA, EMC Corporation, Mindtree, Amazon, Microland, Raymond Group etc.

Rankings

Rankings
SVIT has bagged 3rd RANK in Banglore TOP 100 T- SCHOOLS(PRIVATE), 6th Rank in Karantaka and 31st  RANK  in  TOP 100 T-SCHOOLS (OVERALL) in the ALL INDIA T SCHOOLS SURVEY conducted by DATA QUEST MAGAZINE.

If we consider only colleges from KARNATAKA STATE we stand in 7th Rank & 9th Rank respectively in the ranking list.

Student activities

"Sanchalana" cultural festival
The institution hosts its cultural fest under the "Sanchalana" banner. The eminent personality Ramesh Bhat had graced the events. It is hosted by Cultural Activities Team (CAT). CAT is headed by the principal, aided by the heads of departments, Cultural Activity Committee, CAT Secretaries, the student presidents of clubs, and the student volunteers.

Tech Vidya 
The institution hosts its state level tech fest every year.

Social Service
The National Service Scheme of India (NSS) has a unit in the college. The NSS unit of the college has 100 student members and approved by VTU. The unit is headed by Dr. Harish H T, Chief Librarian & NSS Program Officer.

The students organize blood donation camps regularly. NSS volunteers participates in all the awareness programs conducted by PHC of Rajanukunte.
NSS unit  regularly organizes SWATCH CAMPUS program very often.

Professional Body Student Chapters 

The college has one Professional body student chapter actively working to create platforms for students to learn beyond books.

Institute of Electrical & Electronics Engineers (IEEE)
Computer Society of India (CSI)
Institute of Indian Foundry Men
Indian Society for Heating Refrigeration and Air-conditioning Engineers (ISHRAE)
IEEE Photonics Society
IEEE Engineering in Medicine and Biology (IEEE EMBS)
IEEE Power and Energy Systems Society
Association of Consulting Civil Engineers (India)(ACCE)
•

Notable alumni
 Sanjana Anand, Kannada film actress

See also
R.V. College of Engineering
R.N.S. Institute of Technology

References

External links
 

Engineering colleges in Bangalore
Educational institutions established in 2008
Affiliates of Visvesvaraya Technological University
2008 establishments in Karnataka